Petar Šegrt (born 8 May 1966) is a Croatian football coach and former player.
He is the Head coach of the Tajikistan national team.

Early life
Šegrt's parents immigrated to Germany in the 1970s but took his older brother and left him behind with his grandmother.

Playing career
A defender, Šegrt started his senior career in 1984 playing for FV Calw. He also played for FV Plochingen, TSV Schwaikheim, SV Allmersbach, FC Walldorf and Waldhof Mannheim Amateure. After his first injury, while he was recovering from the operation, he started as junior coach of FV Calw, while he was only 17 years old. Because of his second knee injury, he had to finish playing at 1993, while he was 27 years old. The same year Šegrt graduated for UEFA 'B' Coaching Licence in Ruit, Germany, and started his coaching career.

Coaching career
After four years honorary working as youth coach in Amateur club FV Calw, Šegrt started his professional coaching career and he worked for various clubs in Germany. At Bundesliga clubs VfL Bochum and MSV Duisburg he worked as U-19 youth coach, as second team assistant coach and also as part of the first team coaching staff. In 2000, he go back to the club where he once played SV Waldhof Mannheim in 2. Bundesliga to work as assistant coach and as head coach of the second team. After he graduated his UEFA Pro Licence in 2001 he started to work as head coach in some professional clubs in Austria like DSV Leoben, SV Ried and Wiener Sportklub. In this 14 years of coaching experience Šegrt was remembered as the coach who develop many young players into National team players and he earned himself a nickname "Architect".

Georgia national team
In 2006, Šegrt start working as a part of Georgia A-national team Coaching team together with Klaus Toppmöller. Between 2006–2008 Petar Šegrt also accept the role as head coach of Georgia U21 national team where in a very short time he developed more than 18 players who played or still playing for Georgia A-national team. With Šegrt as coach, Georgia U21 make one of the biggest success in Georgian National team football history with a 2–0 victory against Russia U21 in 2007 European U21 Cup qualification. After Klaus Toppmöller left the Georgia A-national team on 1 April 2008, Šegrt was appointed as first Technical Director in history of Georgian Football Federation. He was also leading Georgia A-national team as head coach in friendly games against Estonia and Portugal in May 2008, before Georgian Football Federation appointed Héctor Cúper as head coach on 1 August 2008.
In addition to his coaching skills, Šegrt gained large popularity in Georgia during the Georgia-Russia war conflict in 2008, after his famous speech at Rustaveli square in Tbilisi, where he promised to the thousands of Georgian people gathered, that he would not leave their country despite the war.

After his great work in Georgia, in December 2008 Germany's leading sports magazine Kicker announced that German Football Association choose Šegrt as one of the candidates for taking over Germany U21.

In the end of 2010, Konsorsium Liga Premier Indonesia invited Šegrt to be a part and help them with his coaching and managing experience to build a new club in Indonesian professional football based in Bali, so Šegrt approached to Bali Devata which competed in Liga Primer Indonesia. After he finished his job with Bali Devata the same consortium offered him a new job as head coach of former Indonesian champion PSM Makassar.

PSM Makassar
In October 2011 Šegrt was appointed as head coach of PSM Makassar. Very traditional club which last years had many problems and not even one national team player anymore. After only one season in Indonesian Premier League Šegrt developed 10 new Indonesian national players, six players were invited for Indonesia A-national team and four players were invited for Indonesia U-23 national team. After success Šegrt achieved that season, in July 2012 PSM Makassar club boards offered him 5 years contract extension, which is very uncommon for Indonesian clubs. Šegrt also have unbeaten home record in Indonesian Premier League, which is the first time for PSM Makassar in the club's 97 years history, although he had youngest team in the Indonesian Premier League as average age of the players was 22. In December 2012, Šegrt lead the team winning the Walikota Cup in Ternate. That was the first trophy for PSM Makassar after almost 12 years. Although he had contract until 2017, after his team winning game in Jun 2013 Šegrt decided to leave PSM Makassar for private reasons. The club's supporters showed their disappointment  by decision of their favorite coach, but together with president and club's management they invited Šegrt to attend the next home game in July 2013. They filled the stadium and prepared official goodbye in front of the game, which is very unusual for Indonesian supporters.

Zvijezda Gradačac
After leaving PSM Makassar, Šegrt was a candidate to coach Indonesia national football team. In September 2014, he accepted the offer from Bosnian Premier League club Zvijezda Gradačac. Although Šegrt brought Zvijezda in the middle of the ranking, in April 2015 the club got a new management and they decided to appoint a new coach. That ended up being a poor decision as the club got relegated from the Premier League shortly after Šegrt left.

Afghanistan national team
In November 2015, Afghanistan Football Federation announced that they appointed Šegrt as the new head coach. Šegrt promised he will use his experience and knowledge to develop football in Afghanistan.

Šegrt won six from eight official matches with Afghanistan. He won four South Asia Cup matches and one lost in overtime against home team India in final 1–2. In World Cup qualification for Russia 2018 Šegrt lost only in Japan and he won two other matches. He achieved the biggest success of Afghanistan in Asia Cup with the direct and first time in history of Afghanistan the Final Asia Cup Qualification. After that the Afghanistan Football Federation surprisingly decides to appoint new coach.

Maldives national team
In March 2018 Football Association of Maldives signed a two-year contract with Šegrt as the head coach. He won his first official match In AFC Qualifications with convincing 7–0 against Bhutan. That was the first win for Maldives after 288 days. In September 2018, the Maldives made a big surprise by winning the SAFF Suzuki Cup 2018 in Bangladesh against any odds. In the final they won 2–1 against favorite India. For Šegrt that was the second final of the SAFF Suzuki Cup as he led Afghanistan until the final 2 years earlier, which he lost to India 1–2. On 7 January 2020 head coach Šegrt and the Maldivian association agreed on a mutually agreed termination of the contract.

Tajikistan national team
On 27 January 2022, the Tajikistan Football Federation announced Šegrt as their new Head Coach. Under Segrt, Tajikistan managed to achieve a historic feat, qualified for the 2023 AFC Asian Cup, which is also the country's first-ever appearance in a major continental football competition in the history, having failed to qualify to the Asian Cup five times before.

Managerial statistics

References

External links

1966 births
Living people
People from Đurđevac
German footballers
German football managers
Wiener Sport-Club managers
DSV Leoben managers
Premier League of Bosnia and Herzegovina managers
NK Zvijezda Gradačac managers
Segrt, Petar
Yugoslav expatriate sportspeople in Germany
Expatriate football managers in Georgia (country)
Georgia national football team managers
PSM Makassar managers
Afghanistan national football team managers
Association football defenders
Maldives national football team managers
Tajikistan national football team managers
German people of Croatian descent
Yugoslav emigrants to Germany
Croatian expatriate football managers
Croatian expatriate sportspeople in the Maldives
Croatian expatriate sportspeople in Tajikistan
Croatian expatriate sportspeople in Afghanistan
Croatian expatriate sportspeople in Georgia (country)
Croatian expatriate sportspeople in Indonesia
Croatian expatriate sportspeople in Austria
Croatian expatriate sportspeople in Bosnia and Herzegovina
Expatriate football managers in Tajikistan
Expatriate football managers in Indonesia
Expatriate football managers in Afghanistan
Expatriate football managers in Bosnia and Herzegovina
Expatriate football managers in the Maldives